Hayat Al-Fahad or El Fahed (born 1953) is a Kuwaiti actress, broadcaster, writer and producer best known for her Kuwaiti plays and the pop culture TV shows Khalti Qumasha, Ruqiya wa Sabika, Jarh Al Zaman,  'ndama Tu'Gany Al Zuhor.

Controversy
On 25 April 2020 during the coronavirus pandemic, Hayat Al-Fahad publicly called for the deportation of expatriates from Kuwait on a local TV channel. Her comments caused an uproar on social media, with various individuals criticizing her for her comments.

Filmography
 
Television
 2020: Um Hārūn, as Um Hārūn.

References

External links

1948 births
Living people
20th-century Kuwaiti actresses
21st-century Kuwaiti actresses
Kuwaiti stage actresses
Kuwaiti television actresses
Kuwaiti film actresses